The Peugeot 4008 is a subcompact crossover SUV produced by Mitsubishi Motors under the French marque Peugeot

It was based on the same platform as the Mitsubishi ASX and the Citroën C4 Aircross, and was developed in collaboration with the Japanese manufacturer Mitsubishi Motors. It débuted at the 2012 Geneva Motor Show, along with the smaller 208. Sales commenced in April that year. The car was replaced by the second-generation 3008 in 2017.

, the 4008 was sold in France, Luxembourg, China, Algeria, Burkina Faso, Slovakia, Russia, Ukraine, Mongolia, Romania, Bulgaria, Germany, South Africa, Austria, Switzerland, Belgium, Spain, Norway, countries of the Baltic, Lebanon, Morocco, Tunisia, Chile, Argentina, New Zealand and Australia. Its twin, the C4 Aircross, was being sold in more countries globally, including European countries not listed above, but not in either the UK or Ireland in right-hand drive versions.

Recalls 
Models sold from 2 April 2012 to 31 December 2015 were recalled in June 2017, owing to suspected faults with the vehicles’ tailgate gas springs. Models sold from 1 June 2012 to 29 November 2013 were recalled in September 2017, owing to concerns that the windscreen wiper motors could fill with water and seize.

Gallery

References 

4008
Cars introduced in 2012
Mini sport utility vehicles
Crossover sport utility vehicles
Front-wheel-drive vehicles
All-wheel-drive vehicles